Cratermaze, known in Japan as , is a video game released in 1989 for the TurboGrafx-16 video game console. The game was re-released by Hudson Soft for the Virtual Console on August 13, 2007 in North America, and on August 17, 2007 in Europe and Australia.

Cratermaze is a variation of the Japanese games Booby Kids (released for Famicom) and Kid no Hore Hore Daisakusen (1987), an arcade game released by Nihon Bussan. A number of contemporary reviews compare the maze-like gameplay to Hudson's Bomberman series.

Overview
In the game, the hero Opi (Doraemon in the Japanese version) is traveling through time with four of his friends when they are captured by the villain Zenzombie. He travels through various eras in time (modern, samurai, future, World War II and prehistory), collecting treasure to open doors to the next era, and kills enemies by digging holes and burying the enemies. Every 15 of the game's 60 levels, Opi rescues one of his friends. Levels 30 and 60 are boss levels where an enormous enemy floats around the screen and can kill Opi with a single touch.

In the Japanese version, Doraemon replaces the titular character Opi, while Opi's friends are replaced with other Doraemon characters.

References

1989 video games
Doraemon video games
Maze games
TurboGrafx-16 games
Video games developed in Japan
Virtual Console games